Balamgarh is a village in tehsil Dhuri district Sangrur (Punjab, India). This is a small village with most of the people with gotra Madahar or Marahar. The village consists of around 150 houses with mostly Sikh Jatt, some Muslims and Hindus.

Villages in Sangrur district